St Mary the Virgin's Church, Week St Mary, also known as the Church of the Nativity of the Blessed Virgin Mary, is a Grade I listed  parish church in the Church of England Diocese of Truro, in Week St Mary, Cornwall, England, UK.

History

Week St Mary has a 14th–15th century parish church dedicated to St Mary the Virgin and the tower contains a ring of six bells.

The church was restored between 1878 and 1881 by James Piers St Aubyn.

The church is a Grade I listed building.

Parish status
The church is in a joint parish with
St Gregory's Church, Treneglos
St Werburgh's Church, Warbstow
St Winwaloe's Church, Poundstock
Our Lady and St Anne's Church, Widemouth Bay
St Gennys’ Church, St Gennys
St James' Church, Jacobstow
St Anne's Church, Whitstone

Organ

The organ is by Bevington. A specification of the organ can be found on the National Pipe Organ Register.

References

Church of England church buildings in Cornwall
Grade I listed churches in Cornwall